Directors Label is a series of DVDs devoted to notable music video directors.

First released in 2003 by Palm Pictures, the series was created by Spike Jonze, Chris Cunningham, and Michel Gondry, the subjects of the first three volumes. Four new volumes were released in 2005, this time featuring Mark Romanek, Jonathan Glazer, Anton Corbijn and Stéphane Sednaoui. A second volume of Gondry's work was released exclusively on his website.

Though another series has not yet been confirmed, other directors rumoured to be in future releases are Mike Mills, Shynola, Samuel Bayer, Jonas Åkerlund, Tarsem, David LaChapelle, Jonathan Dayton and Valerie Faris,  Jean-Baptiste Mondino and Roman Coppola, as well as a separate hip-hop and R&B series featuring Paul Hunter, Director X, and Chris Robinson. Not released under the Directors Label name, a full year before this set or the Director's Label creation, a DVD of Hype Williams' work was released.  After the Labels two volumes, a second volume of Gondry's work, has been released.

In 2010, several years after the last collection was released, Palm Pictures issued a DVD collection of videos by Hammer & Tongs exclusively in the United Kingdom.

Volume 1: The Work of Director Spike Jonze
The first installment of the series centered on director Spike Jonze and was released on October 28, 2003. It includes interviews and audio commentaries from musicians such as Fatboy Slim, Weezer, The Pharcyde, Daft Punk, The Chemical Brothers, Björk, Christopher Walken and Puffy, plus the making of "Drop" with The Pharcyde.  It also includes a commentary on a selection of the videos by the Beastie Boys.  Enclosed is a book comprising Jonze's photographs, drawings and interviews.

Track listing
All videos directed by Spike Jonze, except where noted.

Volume 2: The Work of Director Chris Cunningham

Music videos
"Second Bad Vilbel" by Autechre
"Come to Daddy" by Aphex Twin
"Only You" by Portishead
"Frozen" by Madonna
"Afrika Shox" by Leftfield featuring Afrika Bambaataa
"Come On My Selector" by Squarepusher
"Windowlicker" by Aphex Twin
"All Is Full of Love" by Björk

Other Work
 Monkey Drummer – Video installation. Featuring music by Aphex Twin
 flex – Excerpt from video installation. Featuring music by Aphex Twin
 Mental Wealth – PlayStation commercial
 Photocopier – Never seen Levi's commercial
 Engine – Nissan commercial, featuring music by Boards of Canada
 Windowlicker – Bleeped version

52 Page Book
Behind the scenes photographs, storyboards, sketchbook drawings, record cover art and interview

Volume 3: The Work of Director Michel Gondry

Music videos
"The Hardest Button to Button" by The White Stripes
"Come into My World" by Kylie Minogue
"Dead Leaves and the Dirty Ground" by The White Stripes
"Fell in Love with a Girl" by The White Stripes
"Star Guitar" by The Chemical Brothers
"Let Forever Be" by The Chemical Brothers
"Jóga" by Björk
"Deadweight" by Beck
"Bachelorette" by Björk
"Everlong" by Foo Fighters
"Around the World" by Daft Punk
"Sugar Water" by Cibo Matto
"Hyperballad" by Björk
"Like a Rolling Stone" by The Rolling Stones
"Army of Me" by Björk
"Isobel" by Björk
"Protection" by Massive Attack
"Lucas with the Lid Off" by Lucas
"Human Behaviour" by Björk
"Le Mia" by IAM
"La Tour De Pise" by Jean Francois Coen
"Ma Maison" by Oui Oui
"Bolide" by Oui Oui
"Junior Et Sa Voix D'or" by Oui Oui
"Les Cailloux" by Oui Oui
"Un Joyeux Noel" by Oui Oui
"La Ville" by Oui Oui

Special features
I've Been 12 Forever (Parts 1 & 2)

Stories And Things
La Lettre
One Day
Lacuna Inc
Drugstore – Levi's Commercial
Smarienberg – Smirnoff Commercial
Resignation – Polaroid Commercial
Drumb and Drumber
Pecan Pie – A short film starring Jim Carrey
Three Dead People
My Brother's 24th Birthday
Tiny
Spin Art
Oui Oui – Live concert footage
Spike Jonze 
Chris Cunningham

52 Page Book
Michel's stories, drawings photographs & interviews.

Omissions
Trailers for "Volume 3: The Work Of Director Michel Gondry" (found on the Volume 1 and Volume 2 DVDs, as well as on Palm Pictures' website) include clips of, as well as references to, Gondry's heavily autobiographical video for Radiohead's "Knives Out."  It is unclear why this video was omitted from the final DVD; however, as of June 2008, it is available on the compilation DVD Radiohead: The Best Of, released by EMI after the band had left its contract.

On August 2009, "Knives Out" along with other omissions and more recent works of Gondry's were released on a follow-up DVD appropriately titled, [https://archive.today/20120904120522/http://www.michelgondry.com/ProductDetails.asp?ProductCode=DVD2-896669002000 "Michel Gondry 2: More Videos (Before and After DVD 1)]' for sale exclusively on michelgondry.com

Volume 4: The Work of Director Mark Romanek

Music videos
 "99 Problems" (director's cut) by Jay-Z
 "Faint" by Linkin Park
 "Can't Stop" by Red Hot Chili Peppers
 "Hurt" by Johnny Cash
 "Cochise" (director's cut) by Audioslave
 "Hella Good" (director's cut) by No Doubt
 "God Gave Me Everything" by Mick Jagger
 "Got 'til It's Gone" by Janet Jackson
 "Criminal" by Fiona Apple
 "The Perfect Drug" by Nine Inch Nails
 "Devils Haircut" by Beck
 "El Scorcho" (director's cut) by Weezer
 "Novocaine for the Soul" by Eels
 "Little Trouble Girl" by Sonic Youth
 "Scream" (director's cut) by Michael Jackson & Janet Jackson
 "Bedtime Story" by Madonna
 "Strange Currencies" by R.E.M.
 "Cold Beverage" by G. Love & Special Sauce
 "Closer" (director's cut) by Nine Inch Nails
 "Jump They Say" by David Bowie
 "Rain" by Madonna
 "Are You Gonna Go My Way" by Lenny Kravitz
 "Wicked as It Seems" (director's cut) by Keith Richards
 "Free Your Mind" by En Vogue
 "Constant Craving" by k.d. lang

Special Features
 The Work of Director Mark Romanek (38-minute documentary)
 Romanekian – Ben Stiller, Chris Rock and Robin Williams discuss Mark's work
 The Making of "99 Problems"
 Interviews and commentaries

56 Page Book
Includes photographs by Mark Romanek and Spike Jonze interview with Mark

Volume 5: The Work of Director Jonathan Glazer

Music videos
"Street Spirit" by Radiohead
"Virtual Insanity" by Jamiroquai
"A Song for the Lovers" by Richard Ashcroft
"Into My Arms" by Nick Cave and the Bad Seeds
"Rabbit in Your Headlights" by UNKLE
"The Universal" by Blur
"Karma Police" by Radiohead
"Karmacoma" by Massive Attack

Special Features
Ride – Wrangler commercial
Surfer (extended) – Guinness commercial
Swim Back – Guinness commercial
Dreamer – Guinness commercial
Protection – Volkswagen commercial
Last Orders – Stella Artois commercial
Whip Round – Stella Artois commercial
Kung Fu – Levi's commercial
Odyssey – Levi's commercial
Bull – Barclays commercial featuring Samuel L. Jackson
Chicken – Barclays commercial featuring Samuel L. Jackson
Interviews and Commentaries

FilmsSexy Beast (excerpt) You're the Problem
Interviews with Ray Winstone and Sir Ben KingsleyBirth'' (excerpt) Central Park
Interviews with Nicole Kidman, Danny Huston, Harris Savides, Milo Addica and Jean-Claude Carrière

Tramp
Paul Kaye

56 Page Book
Includes photographs, sketches, storyboards and interview.

Volume 6: The Work of Director Anton Corbijn

Music videos
"Dr. Mabuse" by Propaganda
"Red Guitar" by David Sylvian
"Seven Seas" by Echo & the Bunnymen
"Quiet Eyes" by Golden Earring
"The Game" by Echo and the Bunnymen
"Behind the Wheel" by Depeche Mode
"Atmosphere" by Joy Division
"My Secret Place" by Joni Mitchell with Peter Gabriel
"Enjoy the Silence" by Depeche Mode
"One" (director's cut) by U2
"Straight to You" by Nick Cave and the Bad Seeds
"Walking in My Shoes" by Depeche Mode
"Heart-Shaped Box" by Nirvana
"Liar" by Rollins Band
"Hero of the Day" by Metallica
"Mama Said" by Metallica
"Barrel of a Gun" by Depeche Mode
"It's No Good" by Depeche Mode
"Bleibt Alles Anders" by Herbert Grönemeyer
"Opus 40" by Mercury Rev
"Goddess on a Hiway" by Mercury Rev
"In the Sun" by Joseph Arthur
"Mensch" by Herbert Grönemeyer
"Electrical Storm" by U2
"Re-Offender" by Travis
"All These Things That I've Done" by The Killers

Special Features (stuff)
Beck and Dave Grohl MTV Promos
U2 – The Making of "Electrical Storm"
Some YoYo Stuff
Travis – Love Will Come Through (home made video with Fran Healy)
Depeche Mode – "It's No Good" tour projections
Palais Schaumburg – Hockey (Anton's first music video)
Front 242 – Front By Front
NotNa – a documentary by Lance Bangs about Anton
Interviews and commentaries

56 Page Book
Anton's photos, text and drawings.

Volume 7: The Work of Director Stephane Sednaoui

Music videos
"I Can't Wait" by Mirwais
"For Real" by Tricky
"Scar Tissue" by Red Hot Chili Peppers
"Disco Science" by Mirwais
"Lotus" by R.E.M.
"Possibly Maybe" by Björk
"Ironic" by Alanis Morissette
"Pumpkin" by Tricky
"Queer" by Garbage
"Hell Is Around the Corner" by Tricky
"Sly" by Massive Attack
"7 Seconds" by Youssou N'Dour & Neneh Cherry
"Big Time Sensuality" by Björk
"Big Time Sensuality" (night version) by Björk
"Sometimes Salvation" by The Black Crowes
"Mysterious Ways" by U2
"Give It Away" by Red Hot Chili Peppers
"Le Monde De Demain" by NTM
"Discoteque" (new director's cut) by U2

Special Features
Walk on the Wild Side – Short film featuring Lou Reed and inspired by his song
Army of Me – Animation inspired by Björk's song
Acqua Natasa – Short film featuring Natasa Vojnovic
Reve Reche – Stephane's first short film attempt
Interviews and Commentaries
Stephane's presentation at New York University Film School

56 Page Book
Diary of photos, storyboards, sketches and comments

The Hammer & Tongs Collection
Palm Pictures released a DVD collection of videos by Hammer & Tongs – the duo of director Garth Jennings and producer Nick Goldsmith – on November 22, 2010. Although a Director's Label set for the duo had long been planned, the eventual DVD set did not carry the name. However, press coverage of the set universally referred to the collection as a part of The Director's Label. It is the only collection of music videos released by Palm Pictures since the Stephane Sednaoui set and was only made available in Europe.

Music videos
 "Coffee & TV" by Blur
 "A-Punk" by Vampire Weekend
 "Cousins" by Vampire Weekend
 "Nude" by Radiohead
 "Imitation of Life" by R.E.M.
 "Help the Aged" by Pulp
 "A Little Soul" by Pulp
 "Low C" by Supergrass
 "Pumping on Your Stereo" by Supergrass
 "Bentley's Gonna Sort You Out" by Bentley Rhythm Ace
 "Theme from Gutbuster" by Bentley Rhythm Ace
 "Disillusion" by Badly Drawn Boy
 "Spitting in the Wind" by Badly Drawn Boy
 "Lost Cause" by Beck
 "Big Fan" by The Wannadies
 "Hit" by The Wannadies
 "Little by Little" by The Wannadies
 "The Flipside" by Moloko
 "Right Here, Right Now" by Fatboy Slim
 "Cancer for the Cure" by Eels
 "Last Stop: This Town" by Eels

Special Features
 Interviews and commentaries

Series 1 Box Set
Shortly after the release of the first three volumes, Palm Pictures released a box set including all three plus a bonus disc featuring more recent content. Because no additional Cunningham videos were included on the disc, the box set also included a poster with images from the Cunningham disc. Those who purchased the three volumes individually could receive the bonus disc and poster by e-mailing Palm Pictures, but Palm Pictures is no longer able to provide the bonus DVD and Poster.

Spike Jonze
"Y Control" (uncut version) by Yeah Yeah Yeahs
"Island in the Sun" by Weezer
"Invisible Boards" – A short film excerpt from Yeah Right! a Girl Skateboards film (Co-directed with Rick Howard)

Michel Gondry
"I Wonder" by The Willowz
"Ossamuch!" by Kishu & Co. (original short)

Chris, Spike + Michel
Q&A at Virgin

Series 2 Box Set
Palm Pictures released a box set of Volumes 4–7 immediately upon their individual releases. Unlike the first box set, there was no additional content save for the box itself.

References

External links


Album series
2000s video albums